The 1996–97 CHL season was the fifth season of the Central Hockey League (CHL).

Regular season

Division standings

y - clinched league title; x - clinched playoff spot; e - eliminated from playoff contention

Playoffs

Playoff Bracket

CHL awards

Player statistics

Scoring leaders
Note: GP = Games played; G = Goals; A = Assists; Pts = Points; PIM = Penalty minutes

External links
 1996–97 CHL season at The Internet Hockey Database

Chl Season, 1996-97
Central Hockey League seasons